St. Jacob's Church may refer to:

in Belgium
St. Jacob's Church, Bruges, also called Sint-Jakobskerk

in Norway
St. Jacob's Church, Bergen, burial place of Johan Christian Dahl

in Slovakia
Saint Jacob's Chapel, Bratislava, more commonly Saint James' Chapel

in Sweden
Saint Jacob's Church, Stockholm, more commonly Saint James' Chapel 

in the United States
St. Jacob's Church (Napaskiak, Alaska), Russian Orthodox, listed on the National Register of Historic Places